Roy Frank Drusky, Jr. (June 22, 1930 – September 23, 2004) was an American country music singer, songwriter, producer, actor and disc jockey popular from the 1960s through the early 1970s. Known for his baritone voice, he was known for incorporating the Nashville sound and for being one of the first artists to record a song written by Kris Kristofferson ("Jody and the Kid"). His highest-charting single was the No. 1 "Yes, Mr. Peters", a duet with Priscilla Mitchell.

Biography

Early life and career
Drusky was born in 1930 in Atlanta, Georgia, United States. His mother, a church organist, had tried for years to get her son into music as a child, but he was focused more on sports, allegedly declining a contract with the Cleveland Indians, then beginning his music career in the early 1950s performing on a Decatur, Georgia radio station. He began singing while in the US Navy during the 1940s, and later attended Emory University and studied veterinary medicine. During this time, he also played country music with a group he founded, the Southern Ranch Boys.

Drusky also worked as a disc jockey. In 1953, he signed with Starday Records; the first single he released was called "Such a Fool". That same year, he joined the Grand Ole Opry. A couple of years later, he recorded for Columbia Records, but none of his work gained much success.

Work as a songwriter
Faron Young, a well-known country singer, helped Drusky's career by recording his songs. Two songs he wrote, "Alone With You" and "Country Girl", Young turned into No. 1 country hits. After that, Drusky moved on to Decca Records. He also wrote "Anymore", which charted for Teresa Brewer in 1960.

Height of his career
Drusky charted in Cashbox with "Wait and See" and "Our Church Your Wedding" in 1959.

In 1960, Drusky finally struck it big. At Decca Records, where he worked with producer Owen Bradley, he released a single called "Another", which he co-wrote. Bradley was a well-known producer who had led country singer Patsy Cline to big success in the early 1960s. Bradley helped smooth out Drusky's orchestral tones; the next year, Drusky reached the Country Top 10 with the single "Second Hand Rose".

In 1963, Drusky switched to Mercury Records and released his first hit from his new record company the same year he signed on to it. The song was called "Peel Me a Nanner", which was written by Bill Anderson. He cut a lot of duets with Priscilla Mitchell: one of his biggest hits with her was the No. 1 hit "Yes, Mr. Peters". During his career, Drusky racked up a number of Top 40 Country hits.

Some of his Top 40 songs were written by famous singer-songwriters. Liz Anderson wrote "Pick of the Week" for him as well as "(My Friends Are Gonna Be) Strangers" which is best remembered by the concurrent hit by Merle Haggard, although Drusky's was the more successful record at the time. Kris Kristofferson wrote "Jody and the Kid". Another song, "Red, Red Wine", was written by Neil Diamond.

Drusky appeared on most of the country music television programs of the era; and in 1965, he appeared in the movie White Lightnin' Express and two other films as well, The Golden Guitar and Four Acre Feud.

The 1970s
Drusky had his most successful record in several years with 1970's "Long Long Texas Road", a top 5 hit. He continued to score several top 40 country hits with the occasional low-charting single.

Drusky's last top 40 country was a remake of "A Satisfied Mind" in 1973 which had earlier been a hit for both Porter Wagoner and Jean Shepard. He made his last appearance on the Billboard charts in 1974, but occasionally recorded on smaller record labels into the 1990s. He also recorded a number of gospel albums for Chapel Records during this period. He also returned to writing and producing music, the latter of which he had done since the 1960s.

Drusky's membership with the Grand Ole Opry ensured him exposure for decades long after the radio hits stopped coming. He appeared regularly on the program until the year of his death, singing the hit songs he had racked up in the 1960s and 1970s, in addition to performing country standards from other artists, which became a tradition at the Opry.

Death
On September 23, 2004, Drusky died at age 74 from complications stemming from lung cancer, which he fought for several years.

Personal life
Drusky joined the Seventh-day Adventist Church in 1980. He traveled and performed with Kenneth Cox Ministries for 15 years. He and his wife Bobbye had three sons, Roy Frank, III ("Twig"), Tracy Alan ("Tad") and Darel Bryon ("Tip").

Discography

Albums
{| class="wikitable"
|-
! Year
! Album
! US Country
|-
| 1961
| Anymore with Roy Drusky
| align="center"| —
|-
| 1962
| It's My Way
| align="center"| —
|-
| 1963
| Roy Drusky
| align="center"| —
|-
| rowspan="2"| 1964
| Songs of the Cities
| align="center"| 14
|-
| Yesterday's Gone
| align="center"| 14
|-
| rowspan="3"| 1965
| Pick of the Country
| align="center"| 11
|-
| Country Music All Around the World
| align="center"| 18
|-
| The Great Roy Drusky Sings
| align="center"| 
|-
| rowspan="4"| 1966
| Roy Drusky's Greatest Hits
| align="center"| 7
|-
| Together Again (w/ Priscilla Mitchell)
| align="center"| 14
|-
| In a New Dimension
| align="center"| 20
|-
| If the Whole World Stopped Lovin'''
| align="center"| 17
|-
| 1967
| Now Is a Lonely Time| align="center"| 31
|-
| rowspan="2"| 1968
| Greatest Hits Volume 2| align="center"| 33
|-
| Jody and the Kid| align="center"| 27
|-
| rowspan="2"| 1969
| Portrait of Roy Drusky| align="center"| 33
|-
| My Grass Is Green| align="center"| 37
|-
| rowspan="3"| 1970
| I'll Make Amends| align="center"| 38
|-
| The Best of Roy Drusky| align="center"| 42
|-
| All My Hard Times| align="center"| 20
|-
| 1971
| I Love the Way You've Been Lovin' Me| align="center"| 3
|-
| 1976
| New Lips| align="center"| –
|-
| 1977
| Ramblin' Man| align="center"| –
|-
| 1979
| English Gold| align="center"| –
|-
| 1982
| Songs Of Willie Nelson| align="center"| –
|-
| 1984
| Country Sunshine| align="center"| –
|-
|}

Singles
{| class="wikitable"
|-
! rowspan="2"| Year
! rowspan="2"| Single
! colspan="2"| Chart Positions
! rowspan="2"| Album
|-
! width="50"| US Country
! width="50"| CAN Country
|-
| rowspan="3"| 1960
| "Another (Just Like Me)"
| align="center"| 2
| align="center"| —
| rowspan="2"| Anymore with Roy Drusky|-
| "Anymore"
| align="center"| 3
| align="center"| —
|-
| "I Can't Tell My Heart That" (with Kitty Wells)
| align="center"| 26
| align="center"| —
| single only
|-
| rowspan=3|1961
| "Three Hearts in a Tangle"A
| align="center"| 2
| align="center"| —
| rowspan="2"| Anymore with Roy Drusky|-
| "I'd Rather Loan You Out"
| align="center"| 10
| align="center"| —
|-
| "I Went Out of My Way (To Make You Happy)"
| align="center"| 9
| align="center"| —
| rowspan="4"| singles only
|-
|rowspan=2|1962
| "There's Always One (Who Loves a Lot)"
| align="center"| 17
| align="center"| —
|-
| "Second Hand Rose"
| align="center"| 3
| align="center"| —
|-
| rowspan="3"| 1964
| "Peel Me a Nanner"
| align="center"| 8
| align="center"| —
|-
| "Pick of the Week"
| align="center"| 13
| align="center"| —
| Pick of the Country|-
| "Summer, Winter, Spring and Fall"
| align="center"| 41
| align="center"| —
| rowspan="2"| singles only
|-
| rowspan="4"| 1965
| "All My Friends Are Gonna Be Strangers"
| align="center"| 6
| align="center"| —
|-
| "Yes, Mr. Peters" (with Priscilla Mitchell)
| align="center"| 1
| align="center"| —
| Love's Eternal Triangle|-
| "White Lightnin' Express"
| align="center"| 21
| align="center"| —
| Roy Drusky's Greatest Hits|-
| "Slippin' Around" (with Priscilla Mitchell)
| align="center"| 45
| align="center"| —
| Love's Eternal Triangle|-
|rowspan=2|1966
| "Rainbows and Roses"
| align="center"| 20
| align="center"| —
| rowspan="2"| In a New Dimension|-
| "The World Is Round"
| align="center"| 10
| align="center"| —
|-
|rowspan=4|1967
| "If the Whole World Stopped Lovin'"
| align="center"| 12
| align="center"| —
| If the Whole World Stopped Lovin'|-
| "New Lips"
| align="center"| 25
| align="center"| —
| Now Is a Lonely Time|-
| "Weakness in a Man"
| align="center"| 18
| align="center"| —
| Greatest Hits Volume 2|-
| "I'll Never Tell on You" (with Priscilla Mitchell)
| align="center"| 61
| align="center"| —
| single only
|-
|rowspan=4|1968
| "You Better Sit Down Kids"
| align="center"| 26
| align="center"| 21
| rowspan="2"| Jody and the Kid|-
| "Jody and the Kid"
| align="center"| 24
| align="center"| 9
|-
| "Where the Blue and Lonely Go"
| align="center"| 10
| align="center"| 16
| Portrait of Roy Drusky|-
| "My Grass Is Green"
| align="center"| 14
| align="center"| —
| rowspan="2"| My Grass Is Green|-
|rowspan=2|1969
| "Such a Fool"
| align="center"| 7
| align="center"| 42
|-
| "I'll Make Amends"
| align="center"| 11
| align="center"| 33
| rowspan="2"| I'll Make Amends|-
| rowspan="2"| 1970
| "Long Long Texas Road"
| align="center"| 5
| align="center"| 4
|-
| "All My Hard Times"
| align="center"| 9
| align="center"| 12
| All My Hard Times|-
|rowspan=3|1971
|"I Love the Way That You've Been Lovin' Me"
| align="center"| 15
| align="center"| 25
| rowspan="2"| I Love the Way That You've Been Lovin' Me|-
|"I Can't Go On Lovin' You"
| align="center"| 37
| align="center"| —
|-
|"Red Red Wine"
| align="center"| 17
| align="center"| 16
| rowspan="5"| I Must Be Doin' Something Right|-
|rowspan=2|1972
|"Sunshine and Rainbows"
| align="center"| 58
| align="center"| —
|-
|"The Last Time I Called Somebody Darlin'"
| align="center"| 25
| align="center"| 63
|-
|rowspan=3|1973
| "I Must Be Doin' Something Right"
| align="center"| 32
| align="center"| 60
|-
|"That Rain Makin' Baby of Mine"
| align="center"| 50
| align="center"| 65
|-
|"Satisfied Mind"
| align="center"| 25
| align="center"| 38
| rowspan="2"| singles only
|-
|rowspan=2|1974
|"Close to Home"
| align="center"| 81
| align="center"| —
|-
|"Dixie Lily"
| align="center"| 45
| align="center"| —
| Peaceful Easy Feeling|-
|rowspan=1|1976
|"Night Flying"
| align="center"| 81
| align="center"| —
| Night Flying|-
|rowspan=1|1977
|"Betty's Song"
| align="center"| 91
| align="center"| —
| single only
|}
A"Three Hearts in a Tangle" also peaked at number 35 on the Billboard Hot 100.

Notes

References
 Country Music: The Rough Guide''; Wolff, Kurt; Penguin Publishing
 AllMusic.com

1930 births
2004 deaths
American country singer-songwriters
American male singer-songwriters
American Seventh-day Adventists
Grand Ole Opry members
Starday Records artists
Musicians from Atlanta
Chapel Records artists
Country musicians from Georgia (U.S. state)
20th-century American male singers
20th-century American singers
Deaths from lung cancer in Tennessee
Singer-songwriters from Georgia (U.S. state)